Charlie Banks is a fictional character from the ABC soap opera One Life to Live. He was portrayed by Brian Kerwin from October 25, 2007, to May 11, 2011. He re-appeared on December 12 and 13, 2011, when Viki returned to Paris, Texas.

Character history
Charlie comes into the Bon Jour Café in Paris, Texas, in October 2007. He befriends his waitress, Victoria "Viki" Lord Davidson, and asks her out.

Charlie and Viki have a date at the local drive-in. A recovering alcoholic, Charlie is looking for his son to make amends. He gets a lead and heads to the nearby Buchanan Ranch, where the Buchanans are assembling for the reading of patriarch Asa's will. Charlie is unaware that Clint Buchanan is actually Viki's ex-husband, and that her daughters are at the ranch too. By the time Charlie arrives, his son Jared has returned to Llanview, Pennsylvania. Charlie discovers an injured Dorian Lord in the bushes and follows her home to Llanview to find Jared.

Charlie ends up at Nash Brennan's vineyard, where Jared had been living, and learns that Jared is now residing at the Buchanan mansion. Nash makes no attempt to hide his disdain for Jared but wishes Charlie luck. Charlie interrupts the Buchanans as butler Nigel Bartholomew-Smythe falsely reveals that Jared is Asa's son. Once Jared steps outside to greet his visitor, he is unpleasantly surprised to see that it is Charlie. Jared berates Charlie for his past alcohol abuse and for the way Charlie had treated him and his mother. Jared then informs Charlie that he wants nothing to do with him. Dorian eavesdrops on the entire conversation.

Charlie is devastated by Jared's apparent hatred of him and falls off the wagon, drowning his sorrows at Rodi's Bar. He finds a drinking buddy in troubled Dr. Michael McBain, whose wife Marcie is on the run from the police. Charlie ends up spending the night at Michael's apartment. Michael learns from Charlie that Marcie had been in Paris, Texas, and the two fly down to Paris. Charlie continues to drown his sorrows and shows up at the Bon Jour Café drunk. Unsure of how to handle the situation, waitress Gigi Morasco calls Viki for help. Viki flies back to Paris and convinces Charlie that the fight for sobriety is worthwhile.

Charlie commits himself to protecting Jared by hiding his identity as Jared's father from everyone, including Viki. Dorian, however, knows the truth and promises to keep the secret. Caught off guard after meeting Roxy Balsom, Charlie tells Rex Balsom and Adriana Cramer that his last name is Balsom, not realizing that Rex is Roxy's son. When Rex's investigation into his own background puts his paternity in question, Roxy claims that Charlie is his father to keep him from looking into his background. She begs Charlie to go along with the ruse, suggesting that the truth of Rex's parentage is worse than any lie she could tell. A compassionate Charlie agrees, but is later guilty as he is forced to lie to Viki as well.

On February 15, 2008, Jared indicates that he has at least one sibling when he relates to Charlie the abuse they and their mother had suffered at the hands of her boyfriend after Charlie had left them. On March 21, 2008, Jared and Charlie discuss how during that time Jared's younger brother, Jimmy, had been hit by a car and killed. Though Valerie had told Charlie that it had been an accident, Jared reveals that Jimmy had actually been overwrought because of their mother's abusive boyfriend. Jared blames himself for letting an upset Jimmy run out into the street.

On December 1, 2008, Charlie reveals that he had rebuilt Carlotta's diner, which had burnt down earlier in the year, in the image of the Bon Jour Cafe, naming it the Buenos Dias. Charlie marries Viki on August 4, 2009. Their happiness is short lived, however, when Jared is murdered by Mitch Lawrence. Unable to cope, he starts drinking again and pushes Viki away.

In March 2011, Charlie starts an affair with Echo DiSavoy. In April 2011, Viki goes to Echo's apartment and barges in on Charlie and Echo in bed. Charlie admits that the affair has lasted a month. When Viki asks if he loves Echo, Charlie hesitates, and Viki storms off. On April 12, Viki asks Charlie again whether or not he loves Echo; he says he does. Viki files for divorce.

In May 2011, Charlie learns of Echo's lies and ends their relationship. Charlie learns that the Bon Jour Cafe was destroyed and wants to help rebuild it. On May 11, 2011, Charlie apologizes to Viki and the two part. Charlie returns to Texas and Viki goes to see Clint.

When Viki goes back to Texas for a pie contest, she and Charlie run into each other as Viki again becomes a waitress. Though awkward at first, Charlie apologizes for the failures in their marriage, and they reconcile a friendship. Charlie tries to understand why Viki is in Texas again. When he accuses her of running away from her problems, she protests but soon divulges her feelings for Clint and how she feels like a consolation prize in contrast to Kim Andrews, Clint's younger ex-wife. Charlie shocks Viki by revealing that, despite the love they once had for each other, he always knew Viki belonged with Clint, and that they both still love each other, citing how Clint has and will always be a big part of Viki's life. He encourages her to go after him, prove she is Clint's first prize, and win him back.

References

External links
Charlie Banks profile – ABC.com (archived)

Television characters introduced in 2007
One Life to Live characters
Fictional architects
Male characters in television